Gideon Paulo da Silva (born 16 July 1981 in Jacobina, Bahia) is a Brazilian footballer who plays as a midfielder.

He was signed by Swiss side FC Schaffhausen on 19 July 2007.

References

External links
 CBF

1981 births
Living people
Brazilian footballers
Brazilian expatriate footballers
FC Schaffhausen players
Association football midfielders
Sportspeople from Bahia